The 2018 Meath Senior Football Championship is the 126th edition of the Meath GAA's premier club Gaelic football tournament for senior clubs in County Meath, Ireland. Eighteen teams compete, with the winner representing Meath in the Leinster Senior Club Football Championship. The championship starts with a group stage and then progresses to a knock out stage.

Simonstown Gaels were the defending champions after they defeated Summerhill in the 2017 final to claim a "2-in-a-row" of titles.

This was Curraha's debut in the top flight after claiming the 2017 Meath Intermediate Football Championship. Their 35 point loss (5-27 to 0-7) to Summerhill was the largest losing margin of any team in a S.F.C. match since 1996, when St. Colmcille's lost by a 44 point margin to Kilmainhamwood.

The draw for the group stages of the championship were made on 5 March 2018 with the games commencing on the weekend of 15 April 2018.

Blackhall Gaels were relegated to the Intermediate championship for 2019 after 17 years in the top-flight, including a S.F.C. title in 2003.

Team Changes
The following teams have changed division since the 2017 championship season.

To S.F.C.
Promoted from I.F.C.
 Curraha  -  (Intermediate Champions)

From S.F.C.
Relegated to I.F.C.
 Duleek/Bellewstown

Participating Teams
The teams taking part in the 2018 Meath Senior Football Championship are:

Group stage
There are three groups of six teams called Group A, B and C. The 2 top finishers in each group and the third-place finisher in Group A will qualify for the quarter finals. The third placed teams in Group B and C will qualify for a Preliminary Quarter Final, with the winner earning a place in last eight. The bottom finishers of each group will qualify for the Relegation Play-off.
The draw for the group stages of the championship were made on 6 March 2017 with the games commencing on the weekend of 20 May 2017.

Group A

Round 1
 Donaghmore/Ashbourne 1-12, 1-11 Seneschalstown, Stamullen, 7/4/2018, 

 St. Peter's Dunboyne 2-11, 0-11 Blackhall Gaels, Ashbourne, 8/4/2018, 

 Simonstown Gaels 4-10, 0-12 Dunshaughlin, Pairc Tailteann, 8/4/2018, 

Round 2
 Donaghmore/Ashbourne 1-16, 0-11 Blackhall Gaels, Simonstown, 20/4/2018, 

 St. Peter's Dunboyne 1-12, 0-6 Simonstown Gaels, Trim, 21/4/2018, 

 Seneschalstown 2-7, 1-8 Dunshaughlin, Ashbourne, 22/4/2018, 

Round 3
 Simonstown Gaels 3-15, 2-6 Seneschalstown, Pairc Tailteann, 27/7/2018, 

 St. Peter's Dunboyne 0-13, 1-9 Donaghmore/Ashbourne, Dunsany, 28/7/2018, 

 Dunshaughlin 4-10, 1-9 Blackhall Gaels, Pairc Tailteann, 29/7/2018, 

Round 4
 Donaghmore/Ashbourne 1-15, 1-9 Dunshaughlin, Ratoath, 11/8/2018, 

 Simonstown Gaels 2-16, 0-9 Blackhall Gaels, Trim, 12/8/2018, 

 St. Peter's Dunboyne 0-21, 1-12 Seneschalstown, Ashbourne, 12/8/2018, 

Round 5
 St. Peter's Dunboyne 0-14, 1-11 Dunshaughlin, Ardcath, 24/8/2018, 

 Seneschalstown 4-12, 0-7 Blackhall Gaels, Dunshaughlin, 24/8/2018, 

 Simonstown Gaels 1-12, 1-12 Donaghmore/Ashbourne, Skryne, 24/8/2018,

Group B

Round 1
 Skryne 1-14, 0-10 Curraha, Pairc Tailteann, 7/4/2018, 

 Navan O'Mahonys 4-14, 1-7 Na Fianna, Trim, 8/4/2018, 

 Gaeil Colmcille 2-14, 0-12 Summerhill, Trim, 8/4/2018, 

Round 2
 Na Fianna 0-17, 0-15 Gaeil Colmcille, Pairc Tailteann, 21/4/2018, 

 Summerhill 3-11, 1-12 Skryne, Bohermeen, 22/4/2018, 

 Navan O'Mahonys 0-14, 1-11 Curraha, Dunsany, 22/4/2018, 

Round 3
 Summerhill 5-27, 0-7 Curraha, Pairc Tailteann, 28/7/2018, 

 Skryne 1-21, 1-11 Na Fianna, Bohermeen, 29/7/2018, 

 Gaeil Colmcille 4-8, 0-8 Navan O'Mahonys, Kilmainhamwood, 29/7/2018, 

Round 4
 Na Fianna 0-15, 1-9 Curraha, Simonstown, 10/8/2018, 

 Skryne 1-13, 0-15 Gaeil Colmcille, Pairc Tailteann, 12/8/2018, 

 Summerhill 4-9, 0-10 Navan O'Mahonys, Pairc Tailteann, 14/8/2018, 

Round 5
 Skryne 1-21, 1-11 Navan O'Mahonys, Pairc Tailteann, 25/8/2018,
 Summerhill 3-16, 1-9 Na Fianna, Clonard, 25/8/2018, 

 Gaeil Colmcille 4-22, 0-8 Curraha, Walterstown, 25/8/2018,

Group C

Round 1
 Ratoath 3-12, 4-9 St. Patrick's , Ashbourne, 6/4/2018, 

 St. Colmcille's 1-17, 0-12 Rathkenny, Stamullen, 7/4/2018, 

 Wolfe Tones 3-16, 0-10 Moynalvey, Skryne, 8/4/2018, 

Round 2
 Rathkenny 0-10, 0-8 St. Patrick's, Duleek, 20/4/2018, 

 Ratoath 1-18, 1-5 Moynalvey, Skryne, 20/4/2018, 

 St. Colmcille's 0-11, 0-10 Wolfe Tones, Pairc Tailteann, 22/4/2018, 

Round 3
 Ratoath 1-12, 0-10 Rathkenny, Bohermeen, 27/7/2018, 

 Wolfe Tones 1-10, 0-5 St. Patrick's, Skryne, 28/7/2018, 

 Moynalvey 3-14, 0-14 St. Colmcille's, Dunshaughlin, 29/7/2018, 

Round 4
 Ratoath 4-13, 2-11 Wolfe Tones, Pairc Tailteann, 10/8/2018, 

 St. Colmcille's 1-14, 0-13 St. Patrick's, Duleek, 11/8/2018, 

 Moynalvey 1-8, 0-11 Rathkenny, Pairc Tailteann, 11/8/2018, 

Round 5
 Wolfe Tones 0-10, 0-7 Rathkenny, Castletown, 24/8/2018,
 Ratoath 1-11, 1-5 St. Colmcille's, Duleek, 24/8/2018,
 Moynalvey 2-11, 0-8 St. Patrick's, Ashbourne, 24/8/2018,

Knock-Out Stage

The winners and runners up of the three groups and the third placed team of Group A automatically qualify for the quarter finals. The third placed teams in Groups B and C play off to determine the team that completes the quarter final lineup.

Preliminary Quarter-Final

Quarter-finals

Semi-finals

Final

Relegation Play-Off Group
The three bottom teams from each group enter the relegation play-off group and play each other in a round robin basis.

The team with the worst record after two matches will be relegated to the 2019 Intermediate Championship.

 Game 1: Curraha 0-15, 1-9 Blackhall Gaels, Dunshaughlin, 6/9/2018, 

 Game 2: St. Patrick's 1-12, 0-10 Blackhall Gaels, Ashbourne, 13/9/2018,

Leinster Senior Club Football Championship

Round 1:
 Shelmaliers 1-2, 1-12 St Peters Dunboyne, Wexford Park, 28/10/2018, 

Quarter Final:
 St. Peters Dunboyne 0-7, 2-17 Kilmacud Crokes, Pairc Tailteann, 11/11/2018,

References

External links

Meath Senior Football Championship
Meath Senior Football Championship
Meath SFC